The Swedish American Center, a national institute for migration studies and cultural exchange, was founded in 1960 when 100,000 Swedes emigrated to the United States. The Center serves as a continuation of the activities initiated by the Emigrantregistret/Kinship Center. The Swedish American Center is located in new premises at the Residence in central Karlstad.

The Magazine 
The Swedish American Center collaborates with The Swedish Council of America to release a quarterly magazine named Sweden & America. The magazine is published in
both Swedish and English editions.

References

External links 
 Swedish American Center website
 Page about the Center on Visitvarmland.se 
Swedish-American history
Karlstad
Organizations established in 2009
Transatlantic cultural exchange